Hans "Hanns" Martin Schleyer (1 May 1915 – 18 October 1977) was a German business executive, and employer and industry representative, who served as President of two powerful commercial organizations, the Confederation of German Employers' Associations (BDA) and the Federation of German Industries (BDI). Schleyer became a target for radical elements of the German student movement in the 1970s for his role in those business organisations, positions in the labour disputes, aggressive appearance on television, conservative anti-communist views, position as a prominent member of the Christian Democratic Union, and past as an enthusiastic member of the Nazi student movement and a former SS officer. 

He was kidnapped on 5 September 1977 by the far left Red Army Faction (RAF) and subsequently executed; his driver and police escort of three policemen were also killed when his car was ambushed. The German government determined that it was in the national interest not to negotiate with terrorists. The abduction and murder are commonly seen as the climax of the RAF campaign in 1977, known as the German Autumn. After his death Schleyer has been extensively honoured in Germany; the Hanns Martin Schleyer Prize, the Hanns Martin Schleyer Foundation and the Hanns-Martin-Schleyer-Halle are named in his honour. In 2017 German President Frank-Walter Steinmeier and the German government marked the 40th anniversary of the kidnapping.

Early life

Born in Offenburg, Grand Duchy of Baden, Hanns Martin Schleyer came from a national-conservative family. His father was a judge and his great-great uncle was Johann Martin Schleyer, a renowned Roman Catholic priest who invented the Volapük language. 

Schleyer began studying law at the University of Heidelberg in 1933, where he joined the Corps Suevia, a student fraternity. In 1939 he obtained a doctorate at the University of Innsbruck. Early in his life he became a follower of National Socialism. After a stint in the Hitler Youth, the youth organization of the National Socialist Party, he joined the SS on 1 July 1933, SS number Nr. 221.714, and was an SS Untersturmführer (Second Lieutenant). During his studies he was engaged in the Nazi student movement. One of his mentors at this time was the student leader Gustav Adolf Scheel. 

In the summer of 1935 Schleyer accused his fraternity of lacking "national socialist spirit". He left the fraternity when the Kösener SC, an umbrella organization, refused to exclude Jewish members. Schleyer became a leader in the national socialist student movement and in 1937 joined the Nazi Party. At first he was the president of the student body of the University of Heidelberg. Later, Reichsstudentenführer Scheel sent him to post-Anschluss Austria where he occupied the same position at the University of Innsbruck. In 1939 Schleyer married Waltrude Ketterer (1916–2008), daughter of the physician, city councillor of Munich and SA-Obergruppenführer Emil Ketterer. They had four sons.

During World War II Schleyer was drafted and spent time on the Western Front. After an accident, he was discharged and appointed president of the student body in Prague. In this position he met Bernhard Adolf, one of the German economic leaders in the Protectorate of Bohemia and Moravia, who brought Schleyer to the industrial association of Bohemia and Moravia in 1943. Schleyer became an important deputy and adviser to Bernhard Adolf. On 5 May 1945, Schleyer escaped from the city shortly after the start of the Prague uprising.

Industrial leader in West Germany

 
After World War II, the Allies held Schleyer as a prisoner of war for three years because of his membership as an Untersturmführer in the SS. In his denazification proceeding, Schleyer falsely understated his rank so as to reduce his prospective punishment. He was repatriated in 1948. In 1949 he became secretary of the chamber of commerce of Baden-Baden. In 1951 Schleyer joined Daimler-Benz, and, with help from a mentor, Fritz Könecke, eventually became a member of the board of directors. At the end of the 1960s, he was almost appointed chairman of the board, but lost the position to Joachim Zahn. Successively, Schleyer became more involved in employers' associations, and was a leader in employer and industry associations. He was simultaneously president of the Confederation of German Employers' Associations (BDA) and the Federation of German Industries (BDI).

His uncompromising acts during industrial protests in the 1960s such as industrial lockouts, his history with the Nazi Party, and his aggressive appearance, especially on TV (The New York Times described him as a "caricature of an ugly capitalist"), made Schleyer the ideal enemy for the 1968 student movement.

In 1977 Schleyer debated with Heinz Oskar Vetter, chairman of the Confederation of German Trade Unions in a crosstalk at the 8. St. Gallen Symposium, which later gained a high profile, after Schleyer's kidnapping.

Kidnapping and murder

On 5 September 1977, a RAF unit  "commando Siegfried Hausner", named after an RAF figure killed during the Stockholm embassy attack two years earlier, attacked the chauffeured car carrying Hanns Martin Schleyer, then president of the German employers' association, in Cologne, just after the car had turned right from Friedrich Schmidt Strasse into Vincenz-Statz Strasse. His driver was forced to brake when a pram suddenly appeared in the street in front of them. The police escort vehicle behind them was unable to stop in time, and crashed into Schleyer's car. Four (or possibly five) masked RAF members then jumped out and sprayed bullets into the two vehicles, killing four members of the convoy.  Schleyer was then pulled out of the car and forced into the RAF assailants' own getaway van. 

The RAF demanded that the German government release captured members of their organization. After this demand was declined the RAF members were all eventually found dead in their jail cells. After Schleyer's kidnappers received the news of the deaths of their imprisoned comrades, Schleyer was taken from Brussels on 18 October 1977, and shot dead en route to Mulhouse, France, where his body was left in the boot of a green Audi 100 on the rue Charles Péguy.

See also
German Autumn
List of kidnappings
List of solved missing person cases

References

External links

1915 births
1970s missing person cases
1977 deaths
Assassinated German people
Assassinated Nazis
Deaths by firearm in France
Formerly missing people
German murder victims
German people taken hostage
German prisoners of war in World War II held by the United States
German Roman Catholics
German terrorism victims
Hitler Youth members
Kidnapped businesspeople
Kidnapped German people
Male murder victims
Missing person cases in Germany
Nazi Party members
People from Offenburg
People from the Grand Duchy of Baden
SS-Untersturmführer
Terrorism deaths in France
University of Innsbruck alumni
Victims of the Red Army Faction
Waffen-SS personnel
Nazis executed by firearm